In enzymology, a 1,3-beta-galactosyl-N-acetylhexosamine phosphorylase is an enzyme that catalyzes the chemical reaction

beta-D-galactopyranosyl-(1->3)-N-acetyl-D-glucosamine + phosphate  alpha-D-galactopyranose 1-phosphate + N-acetyl-D-glucosamine

Thus, the two substrates of this enzyme are beta-D-galactopyranosyl-(1->3)-N-acetyl-D-glucosamine and phosphate, whereas its two products are alpha-D-galactopyranose 1-phosphate and N-acetyl-D-glucosamine.

This enzyme belongs to the family of glycosyltransferases, specifically the hexosyltransferases.  The systematic name of this enzyme class is beta-D-galactopyranosyl-(1->3)-N-acetyl-D-hexosamine:phosphate galactosyltransferase.

References

Gene Ontology (GO) codes

EC 2.4.1
Enzymes of unknown structure